The following musicians are professional Jazz banjoists:

B
Dave Barbour
Danny Barnes
Lee Blair
Jack Bland

C
John Carlini
Stian Carstensen
James Chirillo
Eddie Condon

D
Louis Nelson Delisle
Charlie Dixon
Dudu do banjo

E
Lars Edegran

F
Béla Fleck
Albert "Papa" French
Tommy Feline

G
Eddie Gibbs
Gene Gifford
Harper Goff
Marty Grosz
George Guesnon
Fred Guy

H
Clancy Hayes

J
Lonnie Johnson
Sherwood Johnson

K
Narvin Kimball

M
Lawrence Marrero
Jimmy Mazzy
Alistair McDonald
James McKinney

L
Nappy Lamare
"Father" Al Lewis

P
Mike Pingitore
Bucky Pizzarelli
Scotty Plummer

Q
Snoozer Quinn

S
Cynthia Sayer
Emanuel Sayles
Bud Scott
Elmer Snowden
Johnny St. Cyr
Jayme Stone

T
Charlie Tagawa

V
Jack Vance

W
Red Watson
Dave Wilborn
Morris White

See also

List of jazz musicians

References

 
Banjoists